The Health Informatics Journal is a quarterly peer-reviewed medical journal that covers the field of health informatics. its editors-in-chief are Rob Procter (University of Warwick) and P. A. Bath (University of Sheffield). It was established in 1992 and is published by SAGE Publications. Chris Dowd (University of Sheffield) was editor from launch to 1997 and M F Smith from 1997 to 2001.

Abstracting and indexing 
The journal is abstracted and indexed in:
 Science Citation Index Expanded
 Scopus
 Academic Premier
 Educational Research Abstracts Online
 Health & Safety Science Abstracts
 MEDLINE
According to the Journal Citation Reports, the journal has a 2016 impact factor of 3.021, ranking it 6 out of 23 journals in the category "Medical Informatics" and 20 out of 90 journals in the category "Health Care Sciences & Services".

References

External links 
 

SAGE Publishing academic journals
English-language journals
Biomedical informatics journals
Quarterly journals
Publications established in 1992